Holmesburg Junction station is a SEPTA Regional Rail station in Philadelphia, Pennsylvania. Located at Rhawn and Decatur Streets in the Holmesburg neighborhood of Northeast Philadelphia, it serves the Trenton Line. It is located on Amtrak's Northeast Corridor and is 13.1 track miles from Suburban Station. At Holmesburg Junction the Bustleton Branch of the railroad splits from the main tracks and runs to the interior of Northeast Philadelphia. Passenger service on the Bustleton Branch ended on February 13, 1926. In 2017, this station saw 471 boardings and 248 alightings on an average weekday.

Station layout

References

External links
 Current schedule for the SEPTA Trenton Line
 SEPTA station page for Holmesburg Junction
 Rhawn Street entrance from Google Maps Street View
 Former Holmesburg Junction Station (Existing Railroad Stations in Philadelphia County, Pennsylvania)

SEPTA Regional Rail stations
Former Pennsylvania Railroad stations
Stations on the Northeast Corridor
Railway stations in Philadelphia